Mater Dei Catholic High School (often called Breese Mater Dei),  is a Catholic, co-educational high school in Breese, Illinois, United States, in the Roman Catholic Diocese of Belleville.  It was founded in 1954 through the merger of St. Dominic's High School in Breese and St. Mary's High School in Carlyle, Illinois.

The academic program is accredited by North Central Association of Colleges and Schools, and holds a Certificate of Recognition from the Illinois State Board of Education.

Recent developments at Mater Dei include the construction of a new east wing, expanding facilities by adding a new band room, weight room, and gym.

Parishes represented
St. Boniface, St. Mary-Centralia, St. Bernard, St. Mary-Edwardsville, St. Rose, St. Felicitas, St. Stephen-Caseyville, St. Francis, St. Teresa-Marydale, St. George, St. Josephs, St. Paul, St. Dominics, St. Mary-Carlyle, St. Augustines, St. Cecilias, St. Marys-Trenton, St. Anthonys- Beckemeyer, and St. Damian. The school also has many students with other religious affiliations, most predominantly among those is that of the Protestant tradition.

Student activities
The school offers over 23 clubs covering areas from academic and performing arts to ministry and leadership. Clubs include: Chess club, Book club, Science Club, Scholar Bowl, Teens for Life (Prolife Group), Saint Vincent DePaul Society, Student Council, Student Ambassadors, Peer Advisers, Liturgical Planning Core, Liturgical Music Group, Spring Musical, Fall Play, and others. The high school also has a student newspaper (Lance) and a student designed yearbook (Knight).

Athletics
The school sponsors teams in basketball, bowling, cross country, golf, soccer, and track & field for both boys and girls.  The school sponsors teams in baseball and football for boys, while girls also compete in cheerleading, softball, and volleyball.  The school is an independent school which does not participate in a conference or league, but is a member of the Illinois High School Association (IHSA) which sponsors and governs statewide competition in many sports.  For most of its history, Mater Dei competed in the Class A, or smaller school classification.  In recent years, the use of a multiplier on private schools has raised the school to the larger class (AA). They now compete in class 3A of the newly implemented four-class system.

The following teams have won their respective state tournaments sponsored by the IHSA:

 Cross Country (girls):  2003-04
 Golf (boys):  1993-94, 2019
 Volleyball (girls):  1987–88, 1993–94, 1994–95, 1995–96, 2001–02, 2010–11

Notable athletic events
Every September, the school and neighboring Central Community High School play a football event named the Milk Bowl. A traveling trophy in the shape of a traditional milk can is awarded to the winning team to hold for the following year. The event gives both schools the most profit out of all athletic games, activities, etc. and is evenly shared between both. The game's location alternates each year between the schools' football fields. Mater Dei High School also hosts an annual Christmas Basketball Tournament beginning on December 26 every year since 1960.

Notable alumni
Trevor Richards, MLB pitcher for the Tampa Bay Rays
Josh Thole, MLB catcher

References

External links
 Mater Dei High School, Breese

1954 establishments in Illinois
Educational institutions established in 1954
Roman Catholic Diocese of Belleville
Catholic secondary schools in Illinois
Schools in Clinton County, Illinois